Climate commitment describes the fact that Earth's climate reacts with a delay to influencing factors ("climate forcings") such as the presence of greenhouse gases. Climate commitment studies attempt to assess the amount of future global warming that is "committed" under the assumption of some constant level of forcing. The constant level often used for illustrative purposes is that due to  doubling or quadrupling relative to the pre-industrial level; or the present level of forcing.

Basic idea 
If a perturbation — such as an increase in greenhouse gases or solar activity — is applied to Earth's climate system the response will not be immediate, principally because of the large heat capacity (i.e., thermal inertia) of the oceans. 
As an analogue, consider the heating of a thin metal plate (by the sun or by a flame): the plate will warm relatively quickly.

Land only stores heat in the top few meters. 
Ocean water, by contrast, can move vertically and store heat within the ocean's depth (convection). 
This is why the land surface is observed to warm more than the oceans. It also explains the very large difference in response between 
 "equilibrium" climate prediction runs in which only a shallow ocean is used and it is assumed that the climate has come to equilibrium and 
 "transient" climate prediction runs in which a full ocean is used and the climate is out of balance.

The "commitment" can apply to variables other than temperature: because of the long mixing time for heat into the deep ocean, a given surface warming commits to centuries of sea level rise from thermal expansion of the ocean. Also once a certain threshold is crossed, it is likely that a slow melting of the Greenland ice sheet will commit us to a sea level rise of 5m over millennia.

Models 

Recent models forecast that even in the unlikely event of greenhouse gases stabilizing at present levels, the Earth would warm by an additional 0.5°C by 2100, a similar rise in temperature to that seen during the 20th century.  In 2050, as much as 64% of that commitment would be due to past natural forcings.  Over time, their contribution compared to the human influence will diminish.  Overall, the warming commitment at 2005 greenhouse gas levels could exceed 1°C. As ocean waters expand in response to this warming, global sea levels would mount by about 10 centimeters during that time. These models do not take into account ice cap and glacier melting; including those climate feedback effects would give a 1–1.5°C estimated temperature increase.

History
The concept has been discussed as far back as 1995 in the IPCC TAR  and in the SAR.

References

External links 

Climatology